John Richard Lobo, popularly known as J. R. Lobo, is an Indian politician with the Indian National Congress and former MLA of Mangalore South constituency in Karnataka, India. MLA J.R Lobo proposed the installation of musical fountain with laser show at Kadri Park, which is the largest lung space in the city. J.R Lobo also proposed the construction of the 3D 8K Planetarium at Pilikula in Mangalore, which was inaugurated in March 2018.

J.R Lobo worked for 18 years as the founding Executive Director of the Pilikula Nisargadhama in Mangalore. Time and again he has brought up the work of how Mangalore City Corporation has neglected the development work and put the people of Mangalore in discomfort. 

Lobo alleged that he lost the 2018 assembly elections due to the electronic voting machines being manipulated.

Activism 
J R Lobo slammed the Government of Karnataka and the Chief Minister for a casual approach where murders are being committed in the region. The Coastal Karnataka belt has witnessed three serial murders and there have been restrictions due to it.

References

External links
Official website

Mangaloreans
Karnataka MLAs 2013–2018
Indian National Congress politicians from Karnataka
Mangalorean Catholics
1953 births
Living people